Eros Glacier is a glacier on the east coast of Alexander Island, Antarctica,  long and  wide at its mouth, flowing southeast from the Planet Heights into George VI Sound immediately north of Fossil Bluff. It was probably first seen on November 23, 1935, by Lincoln Ellsworth, who flew directly over the glacier and obtained photos of features north and south of it. The mouth of the glacier was observed and positioned by the British Graham Land Expedition in 1936 and the Falkland Islands Dependencies Survey (FIDS) in 1948 and 1949. The glacier was mapped in detail from air photos taken by the Ronne Antarctic Research Expedition, 1947–48, by D. Searle of the FIDS in 1960. It was named by the UK Antarctic Place-Names Committee after the minor planet Eros in association with nearby Pluto Glacier and Uranus Glacier.

See also 

 List of glaciers in the Antarctic
 Gilbert Glacier
 Jupiter Glacier
 Reuning Glacier

Further reading 
 Salvatore, Maria Cristina. (2001), Geomorphological sketch map of the Fossil Bluff area (Alexander Island, Antarctica) mapped from aerial photographs, Antarctic Science. 13. 75–78. 10.1017/S0954102001000116

External links 

 Eros Glacier on USGS website
 Eros Glacier on AADC website
 Eros Glacier on SCAR website
 Eros Glacier area satellite map
 Eros Glacier - distance calculator 
 updated long term weather forecast for Eros Glacier

References 

Glaciers of Alexander Island